Henry Willoughby may refer to:

Sir Henry Willoughby (1451-1528)

Sir Henry Willoughby, 1st Baronet (1579–1649), see Sir Thomas Aston, 1st Baronet
Henry Willoughby, 4th Baron Willoughby of Parham (c. 1603–1618)
Henry Willoughby (governor) (1640–1669), governor of Antigua and Barbados
Henry Willoughby, 16th Baron Willoughby of Parham (d. 1775)
Henry Willoughby, 5th Baron Middleton (1726–1800)
Henry Willoughby, 6th Baron Middleton (1761–1835)
Henry Willoughby (MP) (1780–1849), represented Newark (UK Parliament constituency)
Sir Henry Willoughby, 3rd Baronet (1796–1865)
Henry Willoughby, 8th Baron Middleton (1817–1877)
Henry Willobie, also written 'Willoughby'